Zhu Ting (born 29 November 1994) is a professional Chinese volleyball player. She is an outside hitter and former captain of the Chinese women's volleyball national team. She played for Vakıfbank Istanbul from 2016 to 2019. Currently, she plays for Italian club Savino del Bene Scandicci.

Zhu and the Chinese national team have won several gold medals in international competition, including in the 2016 Olympic Games and the 2019 World Cup. 

Since her debut in 2011, Zhu has received 14 MVP awards at all levels of competition (include national team and clubs), particularly the MVP award of Rio Olympic Games 2016. She is widely regarded as one of the most decorated and successful indoor volleyball players of all time. She was the highest paid professional volleyball player in the world, male or female, as of the 2018-2019 season.

Personal life
Zhu Ting was born to a rural family in Henan Province. She has four sisters (two older sisters and two younger sisters) and her parents do not have any sports backgrounds.

In 2007, Zhu, who was 13 years old and 1.7 meters tall at the time, was sent to a sports training school by her high school physical education teacher. In 2008, she started professional volleyball training in the Henan Province sports school.

Career

Junior National Team
After training professionally for two years, Zhu was selected to be on the Chinese Junior National team in 2010. She participated in 2011 FIVB Volleyball Girls' U18 World Championship and won a silver medal with the team. In 2012, she entered the U20 team and won the 2012 Asian Junior Women's Volleyball Championship. She was also awarded MVP for the first time. In 2013, she continued to represent China's U20 national team and attended the 2013 FIVB Volleyball Women's U20 World Championship, helping the team win the championship. Continuing her high-level play, she was eventually awarded the MVP, Best Scorer, and Best Spiker of the tournament.

Senior National Team and Clubs

2013: First year in China National Team 
Zhu entered the Chinese senior national volleyball team for the first time in 2013, having been handpicked by Lang Ping, widely regarded as one of the best coaches in professional volleyball, who returned as the head coach of the team that year. Zhu participated in her first tournament in 2013 Montreux Volley Masters. Although the Chinese team finished in sixth place, Zhu was awarded the Best Scorer of the tournament. She then rose to prominence at the 2013 FIVB U20 World Championship, where she helped the Chinese U20 team to win the title without losing a set. Zhu was rewarded MVP and Best Outside Spiker in the tournament. Playing her first Grand Prix at the 2013 FIVB Volleyball World Grand Prix, she helped the team win the silver medal, the first for the team in six years. Zhu was rewarded Best Outside Spiker of the tournament on her first appearance for the senior team. Following which, she participated in the 2013 Club World Championship with Guangdong Evergrande winning the bronze medal after defeating Voléro Zürich.

2014: Won silver medal in 2014 World Championship with China National Team 
As a core player, Zhu Ting led the Chinese team to silver medal in the 2014 FIVB World Championship, its best result in 16 years. The Chinese team went through the first two stages with only one loss to the Italian Team. At the third stage, the Chinese team was crushed by the Brazilian Team in straight sets and faced the Dominican Republic Team. The Chinese team managed to turn the tables from being two sets down to eventually winning 22–25, 23–25, 25–23, 25–23, 15–12, advancing to the semifinals. At the semifinals, China avenged their loss at the second stage by defeating Italian team 3-1 to reach the final. In this match, Zhu scored an impressive 32 points. At the final the Chinese team lost to the American Team 1-3. At the tournament Zhu was awarded the Best Scorer as well as the Best Outside Spiker.

2015: Won Asian Champion and World Cup Champion with National Team 
In the 2015 Asian Women's Volleyball Championship,  the Chinese team won all the matches and attained their 13th gold medal of the tournament. Zhu was awarded the Most Valuable Player and Best Outside Spiker of the tournament.

In the 2015 FIVB World Cup, the Chinese team won their  fourth  gold medal of the tournament and their first World Title since 2004 Athens Olympics. Zhu was awarded the Most Valuable Player of the tournament and became the third Chinese player since Sun Jinfang and Lang Ping to earn the title.

2016: Gold medal at Olympics and first year at overseas club Vakifbank 

At the 2016 Rio Olympics the Chinese team was considered a favorite to win the gold medal since they had won the World Cup the previous year. However, the team performed unsatisfactorily in the preliminary round with only two wins and three losses, thus the team had to face the top ranked team of the next group and two-time defending gold medalist, the Brazilian Team in the quarterfinals. China however managed to cause a great upset to the hosts by defeating Brazilian Team 15-25, 25-23, 25-22, 22-25, 15-13. Zhu scored 28 points in the match. In the semifinals Zhu scored 33 points to avenge their loss to the Netherlands Team in the preliminary round by defeating them 27-25, 23-25, 29-27, 25-23. With 33 points in the match Zhu ranked no.3 on all-time top scorers list in a single match in the Olympic games. In the final, China defeated Serbia 19-25, 25-17, 25-22, 25-23 to earn their third overall gold medal in the sport at the Olympics and the first since 2004. Zhu was awarded the MVP and the Best Outside Spiker of the tournament. She became the third Chinese player to be awarded MVP in the Olympics after Lang Ping and Feng Kun. She joined Vakıfbank in Turkey in Season 2016-2017 and became the youngest player in China to be transferred outside the Chinese Volleyball League with the help of her original club Henan Huawei as well as her coach in the Chinese Team, Lang Ping.

She started her first year in the Turkish League in the 2016 FIVB Club World Championship. The team finished bronze after defeating Voléro Zürich in the bronze medal match. Zhu was awarded the Best Outside Hitter of the tournament, and she became the first player in the tournament history to be the best scorer twice after scoring 103 points in this year's tournament.

2017: Second Year in Vakifbank, awarded three MVPs at different levels of competition

Zhu won the 2016–17 Turkish League Best Outside Spiker and Best Scorer awards. In the regular season, VakıfBank finished first with only one loss in the whole season. However, the team was stunned in the semifinals by Galatasaray S.K. and failed to reach the final, although they managed to finish third after defeating Eczacıbaşı VitrA in the third place matches.

At the 2016–17 CEV Champions League, VakıfBank reached the Playoff 6 Stage after winning all six matches in the preliminary round. They defeated Voléro Zürich in two 3-1 matches to reach the semifinals. At the semifinals they defeated Eczacıbaşı VitrA 3-0 to reach the final, despite once trailing ten points in the second set. Zhu scored 24 points in the match. In the final VakıfBank won against the host team Imoco Volley Conegliano to win third title of the tournament. Zhu scored 22 points in the match and was awarded MVP of the tournament.

At the 2017 FIVB Club World Championship, VakıfBank remained undefeated in the group stage to reach the semifinals, where they beat Eczacıbaşı VitrA 3-1 to reach the final. In the final the team defeated Rexona-Sesc Rio in straight sets to win the championship for the second time. Zhu was awarded the MVP and the Best Outside Spiker of the tournament. Also, she became the first Asian player awarded MVP of this competition.

In June, VakıfBank announced that Zhu has renew the contract with the team and she will continue to play at VakıfBank in the coming season. South China Morning Post reported that Zhu Ting is the world's highest paid volleyball player after she signed a contract extension with VakıfBank for a reputed salary of €1.35 million (US$1.61 million and HK$12 million).

The new roster of 2017 FIVB World Grand Prix released, Zhu is selected to be a new Captain of Chinese women's national volleyball team since 2017. Zhu won the Best Outside Spiker individual award in that competition, helping her national team to reach the fourth place and later the 2017 FIVB World Grand Champions Cup gold medal, Best Outside Spiker and Most Valuable Player award.

In December 2017, she won the Turkish Cup with VakıfBank and was selected Most Valuable Player.

2018: Third Year in Vakifbank and Bronze medal in 2018 World Championship with National Team

In March, VakıfBank beat Galatasary in Semifinal of 2017–18 Turkish Women's Volleyball League. Zhu scored 33 points at Round 2 to help the team enter the Final. In April, VakıfBank won Voléro Zürich in Playoff 6 of 2017–18 CEV Women's Champions League. Zhu scored 21 points at Second Leg to help the team enter Final four of the tournament.

In April, Vakifbank beat Eczacıbaşı VitrA in the Final of the 2017–18 Turkish Women's Volleyball League with an overall score of 3:2, and won the championship title. Zhu was the highest scorer in the team. Significantly, in the last round of the match, Zhu scored 20 points with an attack success rate of 68%, an extremely high success rate even among the best attackers.  With this title, Zhu won the first national league championship in her career. At the same time, Zhu was also awarded the MVP award of this league.

In May, Vakifbank beat Italian club Imoco Volley and Romanian club CSM Volei Alba Blaj in the Semifinal and Final of 2017–18 CEV Women's Champions League, eventually winning the club's 4th championship title. Zhu scored 24 points and 15 points in this two rounds and was awarded Best Outside Spiker award.

Vakifbank swept all the championship titles of the 2017-2018 season. With that, Zhu is the only volleyball player in the world who has attained championship titles as well as MVP awards in club competitions of all levels, including the national, regional and world level.

On June 21, VakıfBank announced that Zhu had renewed the contract with the club and she will continue to play at VakıfBank, which will be the third season Zhu plays at the club.

In July, Zhu returned to the National team and continued as a core player. She led the Chinese team to a bronze medal at the 2018 Nations League and was awarded Best Outside Spiker award. 

In September, she made her debut in the Jakarta Asian Games. The Chinese team was dominant throughout the tournament, winning the gold medal without dropping a single set in the Games.

From September to October, she led the Chinese team to a bronze medal win at her second World Championship. She was again awarded the Best Outside Spiker award, her second time at the FIVB World Championship.

In December, Zhu played at the Club World Championship held in Zhejiang, China. With overwhelming support from her countrymen, she propelled Vakifbank to a resounding victory, beating two Brazilian clubs in the Semifinals and Final matches. Again, she was awarded the tournament MVP and Best Outside Spiker awards.

2019-2020: Won Second World Cup Champion and back to Chinese League 

In March, Vakifbank beat Rusaian club Dinamo Moscow in the second round of the quarter-finals of the 2018–19 CEV Women's Champions League. Zhu scored 17 points with a greater-than-60% attack success rate, which helped the team to enter the semi-finals.

In April to May, Vakifbank beat Eczacıbaşı VitrA again in the Final of the 2018–19 Turkish Women's Volleyball League with an overall score of 3:2, and won the championship title. In the 5 matches of Finals, Zhu scored 106 attack points with a 50% attack success rate, ranking first among all spikers. She again received the tournament MVP award.

On 7 May, Zhu and Vakifbank announced that Zhu would  leave the team temporarily, in order to concentrate on training with the national team for the 2020 Summer Olympics. In the next season, Zhu was to return to Chinese league, but the club she would join was undecided.

In September, Zhu played her second FIVB World Cup in Japan. She led team China to win all 11 matches, successfully defending their championship. Zhu performed well, receiving her second FIVB World Cup MVP award and being elected Best Outside Spiker.

On 1 October, Zhu announced via social media that she would join Chinese champion club Tianjin Bohai Bank in the coming season.

In December, Zhu and Tianjin team successfully enter the Finals of Season 2019-2020 Chinese Volleyball League. Zhu scored the highest points in the two Semifinals matches against Beijing.

2021: Won Chinese League Champion, Wrist Injury and Surgery 

She continued to play at Tianjin in Season 2020-21, finally won the champion again, she received her second MVP award of Chinese Volleyball League.

Ting was plagued by an ongoing wrist injury, that first occurred in 2017. Instead of opting for radical surgery, she opted for conservative treatment due to her volleyball schedule. The injury continued to plague her in 2021 and at the 2020 Summer Olympics in Tokyo. After China's disappointing Olympic result in their bid to repeat as Olympic gold medalists, China's coaches and players were heavily criticized across social media by Chinese fans. In August 2021, Ting announced she would be filing a lawsuit against internet trolls for harassment and "deliberately smearing" her. Meanwhile, Zhu did not sign with any club on Season 2021/22, as she planned to take a rest and wait for the surgery.

2022 to present: Recovered, Join Scandicci and Back on the court
Zhu announced on her Sina Weibo on April, mentioned that she has successfully finished the wrist surgery and undergoing rehabilitation.

On 2 July, Italian Serie A1 club Savino del Bene Scandicci officially announced Zhu is transferred to their club in the coming season, which is her second overseas career experience.

On 3 November, Scandicci defeated Casalmaggiore 3-0 in regular season. Zhu was substituted at set two and three and contributed 6 points, including 5 spikes. This was Zhu's first match after 14 months since Tokyo Olympics.

Statistics

Clubs

Awards & Individual Honors

National team

Junior Team
 2011 U18 World Championship -  Silver Medal
 2012 Asian Junior Championship -  Gold Medal
 2013 U20 World Championship -  Gold Medal

Senior Team
 2013 World Grand Prix -  Silver Medal
 2014 World Championship -  Silver Medal
 2015 Asian Championship -  Gold Medal
 2015 World Cup -  Gold Medal
 2016 Olympic Games -  Gold Medal
 2017 World Grand Champions Cup -  Gold Medal
 2018 Volleyball Nations League -  Bronze Medal
 2018 Asian Games -  Gold Medal
 2018 World Championship -  Bronze Medal
 2019 Volleyball Nations League -  Bronze Medal
 2019 World Cup -  Gold Medal

Club
 2013 Club World Championship -  Bronze medal, with Guangdong Evergrande
 2016 Club World Championship -  Bronze medal, with VakıfBank
 2016–17 Turkish Cup -  Runner-Up, with VakıfBank
 2016–17 CEV Champions League -  Champion, with VakıfBank
 2016–17 Turkish League -  Bronze medal, with VakıfBank
 2017 Club World Championship -  Champion, with VakıfBank
 2017 Turkish Super Cup -  Champion, with VakıfBank
 2017–18 Turkish Cup -  Champion, with VakıfBank
 2017–18 Turkish League -  Champion, with VakıfBank
 2017–18 CEV Champions League -  Champion, with VakıfBank
 2018 Turkish Super Cup -  Runner-Up, with VakıfBank
 2018 Club World Championship -  Champion, with VakıfBank
 2018–19 Turkish League -  Champion, with VakıfBank
 2019–20 Chinese League -  Champion, with Tianjin Bohai Bank
 2020–21 Chinese League -  Champion, with Tianjin Bohai Bank

Individual awards
 2012 Asian Junior Championship "Most Valuable Player"
 2012 Asian Junior Championship "Best Scorer"
 2012 Asian Junior Championship "Best Spiker"
 2013 FIVB Junior World Championship "Most Valuable Player"
 2013 FIVB Junior World Championship "Best Outside Hitter"
 2013 Montreux Volley Masters "Best Scorer"
 2013 FIVB World Grand Prix "Best Outside Spiker"
 2013 Asian Volleyball Championship "Best Spiker"
 2014 FIVB World Championship "Best Scorer"
 2014 FIVB World Championship "Best Outside Spiker"
 2015 Asian Championship "Most Valuable Player"
 2015 Asian Championship "Best Outside Spiker"
 2015 FIVB World Cup "Most Valuable Player"
 2016 Olympic Games "Most Valuable Player"
 2016 Olympic Games "Best Outside Spiker"
 2016 FIVB Club World Championship "Best Outside Spiker"
 2016–17 Turkish League Regular Season "Best Outside Spiker"
 2016–17 CEV Champions League "Most Valuable Player"
 2017 FIVB Club World Championship "Best Outside Spiker"
 2017 FIVB Club World Championship "Most Valuable Player"
 2017 FIVB World Grand Prix "Best Outside Spiker"
 2017 FIVB World Grand Champions Cup "Best Outside Spiker"
 2017 FIVB World Grand Champions Cup "Most Valuable Player"
 2017–18 Turkish Cup "Most Valuable Player"
 2017–18 Turkish Volleyball League "Most Valuable Player"
 2017–18 CEV Champions League "Best Outside Spikers"
 2018 FIVB Volleyball Nations League "Best Outside Spiker"
 2018 FIVB World Championship "Best Outside Spiker"
 2018 FIVB Club World Championship "Best Outside Spiker"
 2018 FIVB Club World Championship "Most Valuable Player"
 2018–19 Turkish Volleyball League "Most Valuable Player"
 2019 FIVB World Cup "Most Valuable Player"
 2019 FIVB World Cup "Best Outsider Spiker"
 2019–20 Chinese Volleyball League "Most Valuable Player"
 2019–20 Chinese Volleyball League "Best Outside Spiker"
 2020–21 Chinese Volleyball League "Most Valuable Player"

Film 
Leap (2020) - as Zhu Ting

References

External links 

 
 

1994 births
Living people
People from Zhoukou
Chinese women's volleyball players
Olympic gold medalists for China in volleyball
Volleyball players at the 2016 Summer Olympics
2016 Olympic gold medalists for China
Volleyball players from Henan
Zhengzhou University alumni
VakıfBank S.K. volleyballers
Expatriate volleyball players in Turkey
Outside hitters
Chinese expatriate sportspeople
Asian Games gold medalists for China
Asian Games medalists in volleyball
Medalists at the 2018 Asian Games
Volleyball players at the 2018 Asian Games
Volleyball players at the 2020 Summer Olympics
Serie A1 (women's volleyball) players
21st-century Chinese women